Jason Barry-Smith (born 12 December 1969) is an Australian operatic baritone, vocal coach, composer, and arranger. He works with organisations such as Opera Queensland, the Queensland Symphony Orchestra, Seven Network, and the Queensland Youth Choir.

Education 
Barry-Smith, born in Brisbane, Queensland, is a former student of Kedron State High School. He graduated with a Medal of Excellence from the Queensland Conservatorium of Music in 1991. He later studied at the Hochschule für Musik und Theater München with Professor Hanno Blaschke during 1989/90 and later in London with Janice Chapman in 1999 and in Rome with Margaret Baker-Genovesi in 2002.

Awards 
Barry-Smith has received numerous accolades; in 1992 he won the Marianne Mathy Scholarship (The Mathy) in the Australian Singing Competition, in 2001 he won Opera Foundation Australia's Italian Opera Award, and for the first five months of 2002 he was resident at the Teatro dell'Opera di Roma, Italy.

Concert performances 
As a concert soloist, Barry-Smith has performed in Fauré's Requiem (Melbourne Symphony Orchestra), Haydn's Paukenmesse (Queensland Philharmonic Orchestra), Bach's St John Passion (Brisbane Chorale), Nigel Butterley's Lawrence Hargrave Flying Alone (Sydney Symphony), Bach's St Matthew Passion, Christmas Oratorio and Purcell's Ode to St Cecilia’s Day (Bach Society of Queensland), and as the baritone soloist in the Australian composer's Richard Mills 2001 work, Symphonic Poems. In 2012, Barry-Smith was a soloist in the Australian premiere of Graun's 1755 oratorio Der Tod Jesu. He was the soloist in HK Gruber's Frankenstein!! at the 2016 Four Winds Festival in Bermagui, New South Wales.

Stage roles 
While still studying at the Queensland Conservatorium, he performed the title role in the Australian premiere of Billy Budd. Other roles include:
 Enjolras in Les Misérables for the Wellington Operatic Society
 Major General Stanley in The Pirates of Penzance, the Boatswain in H.M.S. Pinafore, Danilo in The Merry Widow all for Essgee Melodies
 King Melchior in Amahl and the Night Visitors for the National Trust of Queensland
 Nardo in La finta giardiniera for the Brisbane Biennial
 Escamillo in Carmen for Lyric Opera 21, Belfast
 Marullo in Rigoletto for OzOpera
 Mathieu in Andrea Chénier and Belcore in L'elisir d'amore for The State Opera of South Australia
 Geoffrey in Lawrence Hargrave Flying Alone for the Sydney Symphony
 Mamoud in John Adams' The Death of Klinghoffer for the New Zealand Symphony Orchestra
 Morales and Dancairo in Carmen, the title role of Don Giovanni (for which he won a National Opera Award), Eisenstein and Dr Falke in Die Fledermaus, Yamadori in Madama Butterfly, the title role of The Barber of Seville, Guglielmo in Così fan tutte, Papageno in The Magic Flute, Dandini in La Cenerentola, Christiano in Un ballo in maschera, Dr Malatesta in Don Pasquale, Schaunard in La bohème, Danilo in The Merry Widow, Bello in La fanciulla del West, Banjo Paterson in Waltzing Our Matilda (which he co-wrote and directed) and Mercutio in Roméo et Juliette: all for Opera Queensland.
 Created the roles of Julian in Quartet by Anthony Richie and Samuel in Electric Lenin by Barry Conyngham.

Directing
Barry-Smith made his directorial debut at the 2001 4MBS Festival with Purcell's Dido and Aeneas in which he also sang the role of Æneas; this production won him the Perform 4MBS Award for Opera Production. Barry-Smith has worked as vocal coach and musical director of the Queensland Youth Choir. Together with Narelle French, Opera Queensland's Head of Music, Barry-Smith devised several touring productions for Opera Queensland, notably The Food of Love which ran for several years since 2004, and in 2009 Waltzing Our Matilda, co-written with his wife Leisa Barry-Smith. In 2008, he re-mounted Opera Queensland's production of Hansel and Gretel for its tour of 83 schools through Queensland and northern New South Wales.

He held the position of artistic director of the Queensland Youth Choir from 2008 until 2010, taught Musical Theatre/Voice at the University of Southern Queensland's Summer Schools from 2004 until 2014, classical voice at Queensland Conservatorium's Opera school from 2003 until 2013, and from 2009 until 2012 was the Director of Opera Queensland's Young and Developing Artist Program. From 2013 until 2014 he was the Creative Director of Opera Queensland's Open Stage program.

Recordings
CD
Something to Sing About (1985) with the Queensland Youth Choir
Encore (1992) with Vocalpoint
Smiley – The Musical, based on the 1945 novel for the 1956 film (2003) – Original Studio Recording
Misa Criolla – Ariel Ramírez (2005) with the Queensland Youth Choir
Songs of Inspiration (2007) ABC Classics 476 6159
Colours of Christmas (2007) with the Queensland Youth Choir
Portrait of Dorian Gray – John Wikman (2011) – Original studio recording

DVD
The Pirates of Penzance (1994) ABC Video R-14653-9
The Mikado (1996)
H.M.S. Pinafore – Boatswain (1997)

Personal life
Jason Barry-Smith and his wife Leisa, a singer-actor and author, have two sons.

References

External links

1969 births
Australian male musical theatre actors
Australian operatic baritones
Vocal coaches
Living people
Musicians from Brisbane
Queensland Conservatorium Griffith University alumni
University of Music and Performing Arts Munich alumni
Academic staff of the University of Southern Queensland
Academic staff of Queensland Conservatorium Griffith University